1984 Emmy Awards may refer to:

 36th Primetime Emmy Awards, the 1984 Emmy Awards ceremony honoring primetime programming
 11th Daytime Emmy Awards, the 1984 Emmy Awards ceremony honoring daytime programming
 12th International Emmy Awards, the 1984 Emmy Awards ceremony honoring international programming

Emmy Award ceremonies by year